Frank N. Zullo (June 3, 1932 – May 26, 2018) was a Democratic mayor of Norwalk, Connecticut. At 33, he was the youngest person to be elected mayor in Norwalk's history and the city's first Italian American mayor. He served three terms from 1965 to 1971.

Early life 
Zullo was born and raised in Norwalk, and graduated from Norwalk High School. He passed the Connecticut Bar exam while still in law school at Fordham University and began practicing law in 1957. He was named "Young Man of the Year" by the Norwalk Junior Chamber of Commerce in 1958. In 1959 he entered the partnership of Tierney & Zullo (today Tierney, Zullo, Flaherty and Murphy, P.C.). He married Berenice. He served as an officer in the 43rd Infantry Division of the Connecticut Army National Guard.

Political career 
Zullo ran for mayor in 1965. At 33, he was the youngest person to be elected mayor in Norwalk's history and the city's first Italian-American mayor. He served three terms from 1965 to 1971. He was campaign treasurer for Connecticut's senior United States senator, Christopher Dodd, beginning in 1980.

Mayoral administration 
Zullo helped form and was president of the Connecticut Conference of Mayors.  He served three years as a trustee and member of the executive board of the United States Conference of Mayors.

Post-mayoral career 
Chairman of the Board of Trustees of Norwalk Hospital from 1979-1981, he served as a trustee almost continually since 1971, completing his last term in 2004. He is currently a life Trustee of the Norwalk Hospital. He has served on the Board of Directors of Honey Hill Care Center since 1993. He has served on the hospital's foundation board from 1991-2010. A trustee of the University of Bridgeport since 1992, he served as board chairman in 1990-00 and as co-chairman since 2001. He has been a member of the Board of Trustees of the Maritime Aquarium at Norwalk since its inception and is the current board secretary.

From 1976 to 1993, Zullo was a director of VITAM, serving as its chairman from 1989-2001.  He has been a trustee of the YMCA of Norwalk for 33 years, and chaired its board for 12 years.

Associations 
 Prosecutor, Norwalk City Court, 1959-1960
 Minority Leader, Common Council, City of Norwalk, 1963-1965
 Chairman: United Fund Drive, 1963-1964, 1964-1965; President, United Fund, 1965-1966, 1973-1974
 Chairman, Board of Trustees, YMCA, 1987-1999
 Board of Trustees, Vitam, 1990-1992
 Member, Executive Committee, 1966-1971 and President, 1968-1969, Connecticut Conference of Mayors
 Member, Board of Trustees, 1971-1995, Chairman, Board of Trustees, 1979-1982 and Counsel, 1987—, Norwalk Hospital
 State Trial Referee, 1984-1991
 Member, Board of Trustees, Maritime Aquarium at Norwalk, 1986—
 Tri-State Regional Planning Association, 1988-1995
 Selection Committee, Ettinger Scholarship Program, 1989—
 Member, Norwalk-Wilton Bar Association (President, 1996-1997) and American Bar Associations.
 Board of Trustees, Five Town Foundation, 1990-1997
 Member, 1991— and Vice-Chairman, 1994-1999, Chairman, 1999—, Board of Trustees, University of Bridgeport
 Vice-Chairman, Board of Directors, Honey Hill Care Center, 1993—.

Awards 
Zullo's honors and awards include:

 Young Man of the Year Award, Norwalk Junior Chamber of Commerce, 1958, 1963
 American Committee on Italian Migration
 Saint Ann's Club
 Norwalk Catholic Interracial Council
 Norwalk Jewish Center
 Connecticut Society of Architects
 Carver Foundation
 Association of Retarded Citizens
 Sons of Italy
 Boy Scouts of America
 Young Democratic Clubs of Connecticut
 Ma'ciison Sayles Community Service Award from the United Way of Norwalk & Wilton, and N.E.O.N.

Legacy 
 The aquatic facility at the YMCA was named in Zullo's honor.

References 

1932 births
2018 deaths
Connecticut city council members
Connecticut Democrats
Connecticut lawyers
Connecticut National Guard personnel
Fordham University alumni
Mayors of Norwalk, Connecticut
National Guard (United States) officers
YMCA leaders
20th-century American lawyers
21st-century American lawyers
Norwalk High School (Connecticut) alumni
American people of Italian descent